For administrative purposes British India was subdivided into the following units:

Main administrative units
Provinces of British India
Presidencies of British India
Divisions of British India
Districts of British India

Political units
While British India did administratively not include the princely states, which remained nominally outside the British Raj, under the administration of their own rulers, the relationship of the British with these states was managed by:
Agencies of British India
Residencies of British India
Still, the British authorities recurred to the doctrine of lapse when they decided to interfere in the internal matters of a princely state.

See also
Territorial evolution of the British Empire

References